BCSWomen is a Specialist Group of the British Computer Society, The Chartered Institute for IT, that provides networking opportunities for all BCS professional women working in IT around the world, as well as mentoring and encouraging girls and women to enter or return to IT as a career. Founded by Dr Sue Black,  the Chair of BCSWomen is Andrea Palmer. BCSWomen has the aim of supporting women working in and considering a career in Information Technology.

The group was founded in 2001. It has more than a thousand members and an active mailing list. Activities include meetings, networking, and mentoring. They organise the Undergraduate Lovelace Colloquium for undergraduate women in computing, a one-day conference which started in Leeds in 2008 and now moves around the UK. named in honour of Ada Lovelace, often regarded as the first computer programmer. The colloquium is for U.K. university women students studying Computing and related subjects. It was started by Dr Hannah Dee, who continues to play a key role in its organisation every year. Many BCSWomen also participate in the annual London Hopper Colloquium, which showcases exciting work of women in computing research and enables new PhD researchers to meet with each other as well as with senior women computer scientists. Grace Hopper was a pioneering American computer scientist.
BCSWomen organise other events for women in computing both technical and social, such as day trips to computer-related sites such as Bletchley Park.

Awards
Gillian Arnold, Chair of BCSWomen, was invited to Korea on 27 October 2014 to receive the Gender Equality Main Streaming - Technology (GEM-TECH) award on behalf of the BCS and BCSWomen. This achievement award of the ITU - United Nations Women Joint Award, was for "Promoting Women in ICT Sector" and encouraging women to enter the computing sector and to encourage and support them during their careers.

Current and past chairs 

 2001–2008 Dr Sue Black
 2008–2011 Dr Karen Petrie
 2011–2015 Gillian Arnold
 2015–2020 Sarah Burnett
 2020-current

See also 
 Women in computing

References

External links 
 BCSWomen website

BCS Specialist Groups
Information technology organisations based in the United Kingdom
Non-profit organisations based in the United Kingdom
Organizations established in 2001
Organizations for women in science and technology
Women's organisations based in the United Kingdom